Yoshihito Nishioka was the defending champion but chose not to defend his title.

Akira Santillan won the title after defeating Ramkumar Ramanathan 7–6(7–1), 6–2 in the final.

Seeds

Draw

Finals

Top half

Bottom half

References
Main Draw
Qualifying Draw

Nielsen Pro Tennis Championship - Singles
2017 Singles